The Men's shot put event  at the 2009 European Athletics Indoor Championships was held on March 7–8.

Medalists

Results

Qualification

Qualifying perf. 19.80 (Q) or 8 best performers (q) advanced to the Final.

Final

References
Results

Shot put at the European Athletics Indoor Championships
2009 European Athletics Indoor Championships